Vitech Corporation is a systems engineering company responsible for the development and management of two model-based systems engineering tools, GENESYS and CORE. Vitech products have a range of applications and have been used for program management by the U.S. Department of Energy, for railway modernization and waste management in Europe, and for space station and ground-based air defense system development in Australia. In an effort to promote the study of model-based systems engineering, Vitech partners with universities throughout the United States, providing them with its software for instructional and research purposes.

History
Vitech Corporation was established in 1992 in Vienna, Virginia by David Long, then an undergrad student at Virginia Tech. Long, who at the time was majoring in engineering science and mechanics and studying under Benjamin Blanchard and Wolter Fabrycky, developed a software program to meet the requirements for a senior project. He began the project as a tool for academic use, then refined it to make CORE, a modeling environment for systems engineering problems, while earning his master's degree in systems engineering at Virginia Tech. Long initially sought to license the program through an existing company, but eventually opted to manage and market the product himself, establishing Vitech Corporation in the process.

CORE has gone on to become a tool used in the teaching of model-based systems engineering, and is cited in engineering textbooks such as Systems Engineering: Design Principles and Models, by Dahai Liu, The Engineering Design of Systems Models and Methods (pp. 62–66), by Dennis M. Buede and William D. Miller, and System Engineering Management (p. 243), by Benjamin S. Blanchard and John E. Blyler. CORE is offered free to universities such as MIT and the Naval Postgraduate School as part of the Vitech University Program.

In 2011, David Long, former president, and Zane Scott, vice president of Professional Services at Vitech, wrote A Primer for Model-Based Systems Engineering. The book outlines the systems thinking approach and reviews the basic concepts of model-based systems engineering.

In August 2019, Vitech was acquired by Zuken, Inc. as a wholly-owned subsidiary. The acquisition had the approval of the United States Department of Defense and the Committee on Foreign Investment in the United States (CFIUS).

Products
 CORE - Vitech's original product, CORE, is a systems engineering software tool whose principal feature is a single, integrated model that supports model-based systems engineering. CORE is used widely in corporations and governmental organizations and referenced in systems engineering textbooks such as A Practical Guide to SysML, Systems Engineering: Design Principles and Models, The Engineering Design of Systems Models and Methods, and System Engineering Management.
 GENESYS - In 2012, Vitech launched GENESYS, a systems engineering tool built on the .NET Framework with MATLAB connectivity that delivers connected, enterprise-wide systems engineering. BusinessWire reported on the announcement and release of GENESYS, highlighting its new features.
A Primer for Model-Based Systems Engineering - Published by Vitech in 2011 and authored by former Vitech President David Long and Vice President for Professional Services Zane Scott, this primer presents the basic concepts of model-based systems engineering. The book is offered free from Vitech, and is frequently used in university courses to introduce concepts in model-based systems engineering. In 2012, BusinessWire noted the release of the second edition of the book. In the fall of 2017, Massachusetts Institute of Technology used the primer as part of its four-course online program, Architecture and Systems Engineering: Models and Methods to Manage Complex Systems.

Services
Vitech Corporation offers a range of systems engineering consulting services to private sector firms as well as governmental organizations such as DOD, DOE, and NASA.

Service of company officers to INCOSE
David Long, former president of Vitech, and Zane Scott, vice president of professional services at Vitech, have both served as officers for the International Council on Systems Engineering, or INCOSE, the international nonprofit trade organization for the discipline. Long served as president from 2014 to 2016 and as committee chair of the INCOSE Nominations and Elections Committee (2016–present), and Scott as member of the INCOSE Working Groups (2013–present), the INCOSE Board of Directors (2016–present), and as co-chair of the INCOSE Corporate Advisory Board (2016 - ongoing). Scott is also a member of INCOSE's Institute for Technical Leadership.

References

Further reading
 Dennis M. Buede and William D. Miller, The Engineering Design of Systems Models and Methods, third edition (Hoboken: John Wiley & Sons, 2016), 62-66.
 Benjamin S. Blanchard and John E. Blyler, System Engineering Management, fifth edition (Hoboken: John Wiley & Sons, 2016), 243.
 Sanford Friedenthal, Alan Moore, and Rick Steiner, A Practical Guide to SysML (Waltham: Morgan Kaufmann Publishing, an imprint of Elsevier, 2012), 11.
 Dahai Liu, Systems Engineering Design Principles and Models (CRC Press, 2016), 59, 104-108, 127-133, 138-139.

Defunct software companies of the United States